Under the influence may refer to:

 Driving under the influence, the act of driving a motor vehicle with blood levels of alcohol or other drugs in excess of a legal limit
 An altered state of consciousness, attained through the ingestion of psychoactive drugs

In music
 Under the Influence (Foghat album), 2016
 Under the Influence (Mary Coughlan album), 1987
 Under the Influence (Overkill album), 1988
 Under the Influence (Alan Jackson album), 1999
 Under the Influence (Status Quo album) and title track, 1999
 Under the Influence (Warrant album), 2001
 Under the Influence (Rob Swift album), 2003
 Under the Influence (Terra Naomi album)
 Under the Influence (Diesel album), 2011
 Under the Influence (Straight No Chaser album), 2013
 Under the Influence (compilation album), a series of British compilation albums
 Under the Influence – 21 Years of Flying Nun Records, a compilation album by Flying Nun Records
 Under the Influence (mixtape), a mixtape by Domo Genesis of Odd Future
 Under tha Influence, an album by DJ Quik
 Under the Influences, a 1999 album by Mike Ness
 "Under the Influence" (Vanity song), 1986
 "Under the Influence" (Elle King song)
 "Under the Influence" (Chris Brown song)
 "Under the Influence", a 1982 song by Cliff Richard on the 1985 album Walking in the Light
 "Under the Influence", a song by James Morrison from the 2006 album Undiscovered
 "Under the Influence", a song by Eminem from The Marshall Mathers LP
 "Under the Influence", a song by Citizen King from the album Mobile Estates
 "Under the Influence", a song by The Chemical Brothers from the album Surrender
 "Under the Influence", a song by Rusty Cooley from the album Rusty Cooley

In other media
 "Under the Influence" (CSI: Miami), an episode of the American television series CSI: Miami
 Under the Influence (1986 film), a television film starring Andy Griffith
 Under the Influence (2002 film), a film featuring Jim Metzler
 Under the Influence, a 1954 fantasy novel written by actor Geoffrey Kerr
 Under the Influence (radio documentary series), a Canadian radio documentary series

See also
 Under Influence, a 1979 album by Zones